South Bend Township may refer to the following townships in the United States:

 South Bend Township, Barton County, Kansas
 South Bend Township, Blue Earth County, Minnesota
 South Bend Township, Armstrong County, Pennsylvania